The United Order of American Carpenters and Joiners was a trade union in the United States. It represented carpenters in the New York City area, making it one of the largest carpenters' unions in the U.S. in the 1880s.  It merged with the Brotherhood of Carpenters in 1888 to form the United Brotherhood of Carpenters and Joiners of America.

References
Foner, Philip S. History of the Labor Movement in the United States. Vol. 1: From Colonial Times to the Founding of the American Federation of Labor. New York: International Publishers, 1947. Cloth ; Paperback 
Foner, Philip S. History of the Labor Movement in the United States. Vol. 2: From the Founding of the American Federation of Labor to the Emergence of American Imperialism. New York: International Publishers, 1955. Cloth ; Paperback 
Galenson, Walter. The United Brotherhood of Carpenters: The First Hundred Years. Cambridge: Harvard University Press, 1983. 

1888 disestablishments in the United States
Defunct trade unions in the United States
Carpenters' trade unions
United Brotherhood of Carpenters and Joiners of America